David Olmstead is a politician in the province of New Brunswick, Canada He was elected to the Legislative Assembly of New Brunswick in 1995 and defeated for re-election by Kirk MacDonald in 1999.

He represented the electoral district of Mactaquac.

References 

New Brunswick Liberal Association MLAs
People from York County, New Brunswick
Living people
Year of birth missing (living people)
20th-century Canadian politicians